Avery Robinson (January 21, 1878 – May 11, 1965 ) was an American classical composer who worked with, among others, Roland Hayes and Paul Robeson.

Biography
Avery Robinson was born on January 21, 1878, in Louisville, Kentucky. His father was a local mill owner there. After graduating from MIT, Avery returned to Louisville to work for his father and for another mill owner, W. E. Chess.
In 1907 he married Chess's daughter Mary, who would later found the Mary Chess Company, a perfume manufacturer. In 1909 their daughter Carley was born.

In 1920 Robinson left Louisville for London where he was employed as treasurer to the Royal Philharmonic Society. While there his daughter attended the newly founded Montessori School, and later studied musical composition with Nadia Boulanger.

After returning to the United States Avery was employed by the Mary Chess Company. Avery Robinson died in Pittsfield, Mass. on May 11, 1965.

Works
Pieces composed by (or in part by) Robinson include: 
"Waterboy"
"I've Been Driving on Bald Mountain"

References

External links
 
 Avery Robinson on Allmusic: [ classical], [ jazz]

1878 births
1965 deaths
American male classical composers
American classical composers
20th-century classical composers
Musicians from Louisville, Kentucky
Massachusetts Institute of Technology alumni
20th-century American composers
20th-century American male musicians